Sadie is a novel written by Courtney Summers. The book was released on September 4, 2018, and is told from two perspectives: some chapters offering Sadie's point of view and some chapters being styled as transcripts from a podcast called "The Girls" hosted by a man named West McCray. The release of the book was accompanied by the release of a mock true-crime podcast titled The Girls: Find Sadie which is available on Apple Podcasts and Stitcher.

Reception 
Sadie became a New York Times bestseller on September 29, 2018, and is a Junior Library Guild book.

The novel received starred reviews from Booklist,  Kirkus Reviews, Publishers Weekly, and Shelf Awareness.

Explaining the book's structure, Booklist wrote, "Alternating between transcripts of the podcast and Sadie’s first-person account of her investigation, Summers’ novel is filled with her trademark biting commentary on sexual assault and the mistreatment of girls and women at the hands of predatory men." They concluded, "Though Sadie’s story is occasionally a bit overwrought, her hunt for Mattie’s killer is captivating, and Summers excels at slowly unspooling both Sadie’s and West’s investigations at a measured, tantalizing pace." Also discussing the book's format, Publishers Weekly wrote, "Initially distracting, the podcast becomes an effective way to build out backstory and let myriad characters have their say. The result is a taut, suspenseful book about abuse and power that feels personal, as if Summers ... can’t take one more dead or abused girl. Readers may well feel similarly."

Kirkus called the novel "a riveting tour de force," and School Library Journal referred to it as "a heartrending must-have."

Shelf Awareness wrote, "Haunting, captivating and full of surprising moments of beauty, Sadie leaves a mark on the reader and will open eyes to how very many stories begin with, end with or are wholly about 'a dead girl.'"

Quill & Quire highlighted how "Summers specializes in depicting the raw emotions of traumatized girls, drawing her reader deep into the characters’ anguished and often unhinged thoughts. ... It leaves you haunted by Sadie’s and Mattie’s tragic lives and mindful of all the real-life missing and murdered girls with similar stories. Most importantly it questions why society is simultaneously desensitized and addicted to these narratives and the ethics of making entertainment out of them."

The audiobook, narrated by Dan Bittner, Rebecca Soler, Gabra Zackman, and a full cast, received a starred review from Booklist.

Kirkus, NPR, and Publishers Weekly named Sadie one of the best novels of 2018. School Library Journal named the audiobook one of the top ten audiobooks of 2018.

References  

2018 Canadian novels
Canadian young adult novels
Canadian crime novels

Novels set in Colorado
The New York Times Best Seller list